The 2005 PTT Bangkok Open was a women's professional tennis tournament played on outdoor hard courts. It was the 1st edition of the PTT Bangkok Open and was part of the WTA Tier III tournaments on the 2005 WTA Tour. It took place at the Rama Gardens Hotel in Bangkok, Thailand from October 10 through October 16, 2005.

Singles main-draw entrants

Seeds 

1 Rankings as of October 3, 2005

Other entrants 
The following players received wildcards into the main draw:
  Virginia Ruano Pascual
  Suchanun Viratprasert

The following players received entry from the qualifying draw:
  Melinda Czink
  Stéphanie Foretz
  Hsieh Su-wei
  Saori Obata

The following players received entry as a lucky loser:
  Martina Müller
  Shenay Perry

Doubles main-draw entrants

Seeds 

1 Rankings are as of October 3, 2005

Other entrants 

The following pair received wildcards into the doubles main draw:
  Nudnida Luangnam /  Tamarine Tanasugarn

The following pair received entry from the qualifying draw:
  Ryōko Fuda /  Miho Saeki

Champions

Singles 

  Nicole Vaidišová def.  Nadia Petrova, 6–1, 6–7(5–7), 7–5
It was the 5th title for Vaidišová in her career and the 3rd consecutive title in 3 straight weeks, after winning in Seoul and Tokyo.

Doubles 

  Shinobu Asagoe /  Gisela Dulko def.  Conchita Martínez /  Virginia Ruano Pascual, 6–1, 7–5

References

External links 
 Official Results Archive (ITF)
 Official Results Archive (WTA)

 
 WTA Tour
 in women's tennis
Tennis, WTA Tour, PTT Bangkok Open
Tennis, WTA Tour, PTT Bangkok Open
Tennis, WTA Tour, PTT Bangkok Open

Tennis, WTA Tour, PTT Bangkok Open